JPEG XL is a royalty-free raster-graphics file format that supports both lossy and lossless compression. It is designed to outperform existing raster formats and thus become their universal replacement.

Name
The name consists of JPEG (for the Joint Photographic Experts Group, which is the committee which designed the format), X (part of the name of several JPEG standards since 2000: JPEG XT, JPEG XR, JPEG XS), and L (for long-term). The L was included because the authors' intention is for the format to replace the legacy JPEG and last as long too.

Authors
The main authors of the specification are Jyrki Alakuijala, Jon Sneyers, and Luca Versari. Other collaborators are Sami Boukortt, Alex Deymo, Moritz Firsching, Thomas Fischbacher, Eugene Kliuchnikov, Robert Obryk, Alexander Rhatushnyak, Zoltan Szabadka, Lode Vandevenne, and Jan Wassenberg.

History
In August 2017, JTC1 / SC29 / WG1 (JPEG) published a call for proposals for JPEG XL, the next generation image encoding standard.
The proposals were submitted by September 2018, leading to a committee draft in July 2019.
It was mainly based on a combination of a proposal called PIK, submitted by Google, and a proposal called FUIF — itself based on FLIF — submitted by Cloudinary.

Description
The JPEG XL call for proposals talks about the requirement of a next generation image compression standard with substantially better compression efficiency (60% improvement) comparing to JPEG. The standard is expected to outperform the still image compression performance shown by HEIC, AVIF, WebP, and JPEG 2000. It also provides efficient lossless recompression options for images in the traditional/legacy JPEG format.

JPEG XL supports lossy compression and lossless compression of ultra-high-resolution images (up to 1 terapixel), up to 32 bits per component, up to 4099 components (including alpha transparency), animated images, and embedded previews.
It has features aimed at web delivery such as advanced progressive decoding and minimal header overhead, as well as features aimed at image editing and digital printing, such as support for multiple layers, CMYK, and spot colors.
It is specifically designed to seamlessly handle wide color gamut color spaces with high dynamic range such as Rec. 2100 with the PQ or HLG transfer function.

Features
The main features are:
 More functions: Improved functionality and efficiency compared to traditional image formats (e.g. JPEG, GIF, and PNG).
 Bigger dimensions allowed: Image dimensions of over a billion (230−1) pixels on each side.
 Lots of channels available: Up to 4099 channels: main channels: either one channel for grayscale, three channels for RGB, or four channels for CMYK. Additionally the rest of the channels as optional "extra" channels like alpha, depth, or thermal data.
 There can be multiple frames, with non-zero duration (for animation) or with zero duration (making them work more like layers in graphics software). Frames can be smaller (or larger) than the image canvas and can be blended in various ways.
 Independent tiles: Decoding of sections of a large image by allowing images to be stored in tiles.
 Progressive decoding: Mode specifically designed for responsive loading of large images depending on the viewing device's resolution.
 Reversible JPEG transcoding: ~20% size reduction can be achieved.
 Lossless encoding: Includes lossless alpha encoding.
 Support for both photographic and synthetic imagery: The format features two complementary modes that can be used depending on the image contents.
 Graceful quality degradation across a large range of bitrates: Quality loss isn't as abrupt as with older formats.
 Perceptually optimized reference encoder: It uses by default perceptual color space, adaptive quantization, and conservative default settings.
 Support for wide color gamut and HDR: JPEG XL has built-in support for various color spaces, transfer curves, and high screen brightness.
 Support for animated content: For encoding realistic content regular video codecs are preferred.
 Efficient encoding and decoding without requiring specialized hardware: JPEG XL is about as fast to encode and decode as old JPEG using libjpeg-turbo and an order of magnitude faster to encode and decode compared to HEIC with x265. It is also parallelizable.
 Royalty-free format with an open-source reference implementation: The software is available on GitHub under a 3-clause BSD license.

Technical details

JPEG XL is based on ideas from Google's PIK format and Cloudinary's FUIF format (which was in turn based on FLIF).

The format is mainly based on two encoding modes:
 VarDCT mode (variable-blocksize DCT) – it is based from the same DCT algorithm as legacy JPEG, but blocks, instead of being restricted to 8×8, come in various sizes (2×2 up to 256×256), non-square shapes (e.g. 16×8, 8×32, 32×64), or can use another transforms (AFV, Hornuss). It is only used for the 3 color channels, which typically use the XYB color space (although YCbCr is also supported in order to recompress legacy JPEG). The VarDCT mode is based on (lossy) PIK. Lossy modes typically use the XYB color space derived from LMS. 
 Modular mode is responsible, among other things, for efficient lossless content encoding and also for lossy and near-lossless purposes. Modular can also be used internally in VarDCT to save 2D data, i.e. everything except the AC (high-frequency) DCT coefficients, including the DC image (which is always a 1:8 subsampled image so also includes low-frequency AC coefficients in case block sizes larger than 8×8 are used), the weights of adaptive quantization and filter strengths. 
Any additional/extra channels (e.g. alpha, depth, thermal, spot colors, etc.) are always encoded in the modular mode. It was based on FUIF, combined with elements of lossless PIK, lossless WebP, and new ideas that have been developed during the collaborative phase of the standardization process. Modular mode allows lossy compression with the help of the modified Haar transform called "squeeze" which has progressive properties, quality of the image increases with the amount of data loaded.

One of the ways VarDCT-based images can be loaded more progressively is by saving the DC coefficients in a separate "DC frame" that uses modular squeeze: allowing previews corresponding to 1:16, 1:32 etc subsampled images. A squeeze transform can also be used to encode the alpha channel progressively together with VarDCT-encoded color channels, making both modes work in tandem.

JPEG XL defaults to a visually near-lossless setting that still provides good compression.

These modes can be assisted by separate modeling of specific image features called:
 Splines for coding e.g. hairs (not yet used by the reference encoder).
 Repeating "patches" like text, dots, or sprites.
 Noise synthesis: since noise is hard to compress, it is better to separate it out and then regenerate it in the decoder. This is similar to film grain synthesis in modern video codecs like AV1, although JPEG XL's noise synthesis is not aiming to mimick the granularity of analog photographic film, but rather to model the photon noise at the pixel level like what you get on a digital camera at high ISO settings.

JPEG XL codec can losslessly transcode a widely-supported subset of JPEG files, by directly copying JPEG's DCT block coefficients to 8×8 VarDCT blocks, making smaller file sizes possible due to JPEG XL's superior entropy coding. This process is reversible and it allows for the original JPEG file to be reconstructed bit-for-bit, although constraints limit support for some files.

Prediction is run using a pixel-by-pixel decorrelator without side information, including a parameterized self-correcting weighted ensemble of predictors. Context modeling includes specialized static models and powerful meta-adaptive models that take local error into account, with a signaled tree structure and predictor selection per context. Entropy coding is LZ77-enabled and can use either asymmetric numeral systems or Prefix codes (useful for low-complexity encoders, or reducing the overhead of short streams).

Animated (multi-frame) images do not perform advanced inter-frame prediction, though some rudimentary inter-frame coding tools are available:
 Frames can be smaller than the full canvas size, leaving other pixels untouched.
 Frames support several blending modes in addition to replacing previous frames, such as addition or multiplication.
 Up to four frames can be remembered and referenced by later frames, using the "patches" coding tool.

Industry support and adoption
Besides Cloudinary and Google (originally), throughout JPEG XL's preliminary implementation in web browsers, various representatives of well-known industry brand names have publicly voiced support for JPEG XL as their preferred choice, including Facebook, Adobe, Intel and the Video Electronics Standards Association, The Guardian, Flickr and SmugMug, Shopify, the Krita Foundation, and Serif Ltd.

Software

Codec implementations

 JPEG XL Reference Software (libjxl)
 license: New BSD License (previously Apache License 2.0)
 contains (among others):
 encode/decode library libjxl
 encoder cjxl
 decoder djxl
 fast lossless-only encoder fjxl
 tool for benchmarking speed and quality of image codecs benchmark_xl
 GIMP and Gtk pixbuf plugin file-jxl
 J40: Independent, self-contained JPEG XL decoder J40: Independent, self-contained JPEG XL decoder
 license: MIT License No Attribution
 C99 single header library (no dependencies)
 In Roman numerals, "XL" denotes 40, hence the name
libjxl-tiny: a simpler encoder implementation of JPEG XL, aimed at photographic images without an alpha channel.
 license: New BSD License
 jxlatte: Java JPEG XL decoder 
 license: MIT License
 pyjxl: A Python JPEG XL decoder.
 license: MIT License
 jpeg-xl-encode: a PHP JPEG XL encoder.
 license: MIT License

Official support
 Squoosh – In-browser image converter
 Adobe Camera Raw – Adobe Photoshop's import/export for digital camera images
 Affinity Photo – raster graphics editor
 Chasys Draw IES – raster graphics editor
 Darktable – raw photo management application
 ExifTool – metadata editor
 FFmpeg – multimedia framework, via libjxl
 GIMP – raster graphics editor
 gThumb – image viewer and photo management application for Linux
 ImageMagick – toolkit for raster graphics processing
 XnView MP – viewer and editor of raster graphics
 JPEGView and Ksnip - Verified on GitHub.com
 IrfanView – image viewer and editor for Windows
 KaOS – Linux distribution
 Krita – raster graphics editor
 libvips – image processing library
 vipsdisp – high-performance ultra-high-resolution image viewer for Linux
 Qt and KDE apps – via KImageFormats
 Pale Moon – web browser

Unofficial or indirect support
 Microsoft Windows – A 3rd-party Windows Imaging Component (WIC) plugin adds viewing to File Explorer, Microsoft Photos, Windows Photo Viewer, and aware apps. Thumbnail view, unstable Only On Windows 7/10 OS.
Another Windows plugin, JXL WIN Thumb old libjxl version 0.5.0:
 macOS – via a standalone app and a plugin for Quick Look
 GTK and GNOME image viewing apps (such as Eye of GNOME, GNOME Files, etc.) through the GDK pixbuf plugin provided by the JPEG XL project

Preliminary web browser support
 Firefox web browser – introduced for testing in Firefox Nightly build

Support for JPEG XL in Chromium and Chrome web browsers was introduced for testing April 1, 2021 and removed on December 9, 2022. The Chrome team cited a lack of interest from the ecosystem, insufficient improvements, and a wish to focus on improving existing formats, as reasons for the removal. The decision was met with opposition from the community, with many voicing support for JPEG XL on Chromium's bug tracker. Jon Sneyers, co-author of the JPEG XL spec, has questioned the conclusions drawn by the Chrome team, saying: "I think there has been an unfortunate misinterpretation of the data... which has unfortunately lead  to an incorrect decision."

Standardization status

Rivals
AVIF - AV1 video codec in a HEIF container
HEIC - HEVC video codec in a HEIF container
WebP - VP8 video codec in a RIFF container

Notes

References

External links

 
 
 builds: Nightly dev builds
 Community website
 J40 Independent, self-contained JPEG XL decoder

XL
Animated graphics file formats
Graphics standards
Image compression
ISO standards
ITU-T recommendations
Open formats
Raster graphics file formats